Svein Olav Herstad (born 7 July 1969 in Odda, Norway) is a jazz pianist, known from his own bands and several recordings with musicians like Sonny Simmons, Jan Erik Kongshaug, Nils-Olav Johansen, Harald Johnsen, and Per Oddvar Johansen.

Career 
Herstad studied music at Musikkskolen in Haugesund, and is a graduate from the Jazz program at Trondheim Musikkonsevatorium, (1990–93). He started the band Svein Olav Herstad trio during his studies in Trondheim. With different lineups the band has released a series of albums, performing Herstad's own compositions. After moving to Oslo (1996–2001) he played within Jan Erik Kongshaug's quartet on two albums (1998, 2003). Living in Haugesund from 2001, he has been engaged with the festival Sildajazz, as well as being a part of the Christina Bjordal Band.

Discography

Solo piano 
 2010: Free the Nightingale (Ponca Jazz)

Svein Olav Herstad Trio (including Magne Thormodsæter and Håkon Mjåset Johansen) 
 2006: Suite for Simmons (Jazzaway), featuring Sonny Simmons live from Festiviteten Hall, Sildajazz in Haugesund (2005), performing a commission in six parts
 2007: Inventio (Jazzaway Records)
 2017: The Ballad Book (Curling Legs)

As leader 
 1993: Dig (Ponca Jazz), within a trio including Harald Johnsen and Torbjørn Engan
 1997: Sommerregn (Ponca Jazz ), within a trio including Harald Johnsen and Per Oddvar Johansen

Collaborative works 
Within Jan Erik Kongshaug trio including Harald Johnsen & Per Oddvar Johansen
 1998: The Other World (ACT)
 2003: All These Years (Hot Club)

Within Christina Bjordal Band
 2003: Where Dreams Begin (EmArcy/Universal)

With Organ Jam
 2013: Organics (Normann)

References

External links 

20th-century Norwegian pianists
21st-century Norwegian pianists
Norwegian jazz pianists
Norwegian jazz composers
Ponca Jazz Records artists
Jazzaway Records artists
Norwegian University of Science and Technology alumni
Musicians from Odda
1969 births
Living people